Rosa 'Ena Harkness' is a medium red hybrid tea rose cultivar, developed by Albert Norman before 1940 and introduced into Britain by Harkness Roses in 1946. It was awarded the RNRS Gold Medal by the Royal National Rose Society (RNRS) in 1945 and the Portland Gold Medal in 1955.

Description
'Ena Harkness' is a short, upright hybrid tea rose, 2–3 ft (90–121 cm) in height, with a 2 ft (61 cm) plant spread. The rose has a full (26-40 petals) high-centered bloom form with 4–5 in (10-12.7 cm) flowers. 'Ena Harkness' has  a strong fruity fragrance with a medium red bloom color. The rose blooms in flushes from spring to late fall and is very disease resistant. The flowers also hold up to rain very well. The foliage is dark green and the plant has many thorns and prickles.

History

'Ena Harkness' was developed by amateur rose breeder Albert Norman before 1940. A family friend of the Harkness family of Harkness Roses, Norman was a diamond cutter by profession. Norman developed the rose by hybridizing Rosa 'Southport' and  Rosa 'Crimson Glory'. He wanted to name his new rose for his friend and rose grower Bill Harkness, but Bill asked him to name the rose after his wife "Ena". Norman also developed 'Frensham', 'Vera Dalton' and 'Anne Elizabeth' for Harkness Roses. Norman later became president of the National Rose Society of Great Britain.

'Ena Harkness' was introduced into Britain by Harkness Roses in 1946 and "made the fortune of the Harkness family". The legendary rose nursery, which continues to sell roses today, was established in 1879 in Bedale, Yorkshire by brothers John Harkness (1857-1933) and (Robert Harkness (1851-1920). 'Ena Harkness' was used to develop two rose cultivars, Rosa 'Hanne'  and Rosa 'Red Dandy'. 'Ena Harkness' was awarded the RNRS Gold Medal by the Royal National Rose Society (RNRS) in 1945 and the Portland Gold Medal in 1955.

Child plants
 Rosa 'Hanne' (Soenderhousen, 1959)
 Rosa 'Red Dandy' (Norman, 1959)

References

Ena Harkness
1946 introductions